Phenylhydroxylamine is the organic compound with the formula C6H5NHOH.  It is an intermediate in the redox-related pair C6H5NH2 and C6H5NO. Phenylhydroxylamine should not be confused with its isomer α-phenylhydroxylamine or O-phenylhydroxylamine.

Preparation
This compound can be prepared by the reduction of nitrobenzene with zinc in the presence of NH4Cl.

Alternatively, it can be prepared by transfer hydrogenation of nitrobenzene using hydrazine as an H2 source over a rhodium catalyst.

Reactions

Phenylhydroxylamine is unstable to heating, and in the presence of strong acids easily rearranges to 4-aminophenol via the Bamberger rearrangement. Oxidation of phenylhydroxylamine with dichromate gives nitrosobenzene.

The compound condenses with benzaldehyde to form diphenylnitrone, a well-known 1,3-dipole:
C6H5NHOH + C6H5CHO →  C6H5N(O)=CHC6H5 + H2O

Phenylhydroxylamine is attacked by NO+ sources to give cupferron:
C6H5NHOH + C4H9ONO + NH3 → NH4[C6H5N(O)NO] + C4H9OH

References

Hydroxylamines